The Ministry of Finance and Prices of Cuba is responsible for managing the public finances of Cuba, including budget, tax, treasury, price and public credit policies.

History
The organization was called Ministry of Finance from 1902 to 1965. Between 1965 and 1976, the ministry was abolished and its functions passed to the Central Bank of Cuba. Between 1976 and 1994, these functions were transferred to the State Finance Committee. Finally, in 1994, the State Finance Committee merged with the State Price Committee to form the current Ministry of Finance and Prices.

Ministers of Finance 1902-1959
()
José García Montes, May 1902 - March 1905
Juan Rius Rivera, March 1905 - May 1906
Ernesto Font Sterling, May 1906 - September 1906
Gabriel García Echarte, September 1906 - January 1909
Marcelino Díaz de Villegas, January 1909 - July 1909
Francisco de P. Machado, August 1910 - April 1911
Rafael Martínez Ortíz, April 1911 - February 1912
Manuel Gutiérrez Quirós, February 1912 - May 1913
Leopoldo Cancio, May 1913 - December 1920
Miguel Iribarren, January 1921 - May 1921
Sebastián Gelabert, May 1921 - June 1922
Manuel Despaigne Riverie, June 1922 - April 1923
Enrique Hernández Cartaya, April 1923 - October 1923
Carlos Portela, February 1924 - May 1925
Enrique Hernández Cartaya, May 1925 - April 1927
Santiago Gutiérrez Celis, April 1927 - October 1929
Mario Ruiz Mesa, October 1929 - September 1932
Octavio Averhoff, December 1932 - August 1933
Joaquín Martínez Sáenz, August 1933 - September 1933
Manuel Despaigne Riverie, September 1933 - January 1934
Joaquín Martínez Sáenz, January 1934 - June 1934
Manuel Despaigne Riverie, October 1934 - June 1935
Maximiliano Smith, June 1935 - August 1935
Ricardo Ponce, August 1935 - May 1936
Germán Wolter del Río, May 1936 - October 1936
Manuel Dorta Duque, October 1936 - December 1936
Eduardo I. Montoulieu, December 1936 - March 1937
Manuel Jiménez Lanier, March 1937 - August 1938
Amadeo López Castro, August 1938 - October 1938
Oscar García Montes, October 1938 - May 1939
Joaquín Ochotorena, May 1939 - May 1940
Andrés Domingo Morales, October 1940-July 1941
Oscar García Montes, July 1941 - February 1942
Luis Vidal de la Torre, February 1942 - April 1942
Oscar García Montes, April 1942 - June 1942
Luis Vidal de la Torre, June 1942 - July 1942
José M. Irisarri Gamio, July 1942 - September 1942
Luis Vidal de la Torre, September 1942 - September 1942
Eduardo I. Montoulieu, ? – 1943 – 1944
Manuel Fernández Supervielle, 1944 – 1946
Isauro Valdés Moreno, 1946 – 1948
Antonio Prío Socarrás, 1948 – 1949
José M. Bosch, 1949 – 1951
José R. Alvarez Díaz, 1951 – 1952
Marino López Blanco, 1952 – 1953
Gustavo Gutiérrez y Sánchez, 1953 – 1955
Justo García Rainery, 1955 – 1958
Alejandro Herrera Arango, 1958 – January 1959

Ministers of Finance since 1959
Raúl Chibás, 1959
Rufo López-Fresquet, 1959 – 1960
Rolando Díaz Aztaraín, 1960 – 1962
Luis Álvarez Rom, 1962 – 1965
Orlando Pérez Rodríguez, 1965 – 1973
Raúl León Torrás, 1973 – 1976
Francisco García Vals, 1976 – 1985
Rodrigo García León, 1985 – 1993
José Luis Rodríguez García, 1993 – 1995
Manuel Millares Rodríguez, 1995 – 2003
Georgina Barreiro Fajardo, 2003 – 2009
Lina Olinda Pedraza Rodríguez, 2009 – 2019
Meisi Bolaños Weiss, January 2019 –

References

Politics of Cuba
Government ministries of Cuba
Cuba
Economy of Cuba
1902 establishments in Cuba
1994 establishments in Cuba